Dosquet is a municipality in Lotbinière Regional County Municipality in the Chaudière-Appalaches region of Quebec, Canada. Its population was 944 as of the Canada 2016 Census.

Known officially until 1996 as Saint-Octave-de-Dosquet, the post office was named simply Dosquet in 1913, after Pierre-Herman Dosquet, fourth bishop of Quebec.

References

External links
 
Commission de toponymie du Québec
Ministère des Affaires municipales, des Régions et de l'Occupation du territoire 

Municipalities in Quebec
Incorporated places in Chaudière-Appalaches
Lotbinière Regional County Municipality